Conservative Business Relations is an organ of the UK Conservative Party that organises a variety of networking and policy events for businesses.  It has hosted a number of networking events and seminars. Alexandra Robson is the Head of Business Relations.

References

External links
Conservative Party
Conservative Business Relations

Business organisations based in the United Kingdom
Organisations associated with the Conservative Party (UK)